Philips Avent, stylized as Philips AVENT, is a child care brand which manufactures baby bottles, breast pumps, and other baby feeding and health accessories. It is based in Amsterdam, Netherlands.

The name AVENT came from the sub-brand Avent Naturally which was launched by a Company called Cannon Rubber (est.1936). The brand was created in 1984 to launch a new type of baby bottle that was short with a wide neck. Avent was the first baby feeding company to produce teats from odourless and tasteless silicone as well as other patented innovations such a steam and microwave steriliser and piston-free breast Pump.

In 2005, Charterhouse Venture Capital acquired the company, then known as Cannon Avent.

In 2006, Dutch company Philips acquired the brand and renamed it as Philips Avent.

History 
In 1982, Edward Atkin, a young British man, at the birth of his first child, wanted to improve the traditional baby bottles which had several defects when used: the teats were hard and narrow and the container unstable and difficult to fill. He wants to rethink the bottle created years earlier by his father, David Atkin. It creates a wide neck for easy filling and cleaning and adds a soft, flared silicone teat that is tasteless and odorless. This pacifier, presented as equipped with an advanced anti-colic system, marks the beginning of the Avent brand in breastfeeding and bottle feeding.

From 1990 to 2000, the brand diversified by offering sterilisers, bottle warmers, breastfeeding accessories, pacifiers, cutlery sets and cups, toiletries and a line of baby luggage. The company also launches the first manual breast pump.

In 2009, following the controversy over bisphenol A, new materials are used to manufacture baby bottles.

In 2013, the brand launched the Natural range, a new range of bottles: the teat wants to more closely imitate the shape of the breast for natural breastfeeding, the bottle is more ergonomic and the anti-colic system is equipped with a double valve.

Awards 
Philips Avent has won several international awards for its products. Its Smart Baby Bottle won an international Good Design Award for three years running, from 2017 to 2019, while its Advanced Bottle Sterilizer and Dryer won the Good Design Award in 2020.

Its electric breast pump also won an IF Design Award in 2020.

Factory 
The Avent manufacturing plant was located in Suffolk, a region east of England however it was closed in 2020 by Philips due to Brexit. Manufacturing is now done outside of the UK.

References

External links

History of Philips AVENT
شیشه شیر اونت

Philips
Infant feeding
Manufacturing companies of the United Kingdom
2006 mergers and acquisitions
Child care companies
1984 establishments in the United Kingdom